Minhazur Rahman (born 27 September 2001) is a Bangladeshi cricketer. He made his Twenty20 debut for Legends of Rupganj in the 2018–19 Dhaka Premier Division Twenty20 Cricket League on 27 February 2019. He made his List A debut for Legends of Rupganj in the 2018–19 Dhaka Premier Division Cricket League on 22 March 2019. He made his first-class debut for Khulna Division in the 2020–21 National Cricket League on 22 March 2021.

References

External links
 

2001 births
Living people
Bangladeshi cricketers
Khulna Division cricketers
Legends of Rupganj cricketers
Place of birth missing (living people)